The Zimbabwe International Film Festival  (abbreviated as ZIFF) is an annual ten-day film festival held in Zimbabwe in August or September. Instituted in 1998, it is organised by the Zimbabwe International Film Festival Trust (ZIFFT), a non-profit organisation. The festival is a non-political competitive platform that provides a showcase of feature films, documentary films and short films, as well as providing workshops and other cultural events.

References

External links
 

Film festivals in Zimbabwe
1998 establishments in Zimbabwe
Recurring events established in 1998
Annual events in Zimbabwe
Festivals in Zimbabwe